The Panorama Music Festival (commonly referred to as Panorama) is a multi-day music festival held on Randall's Island in New York City. It is presented by Goldenvoice.

History 
Goldenvoice, the company behind Panorama, is a subsidiary of AEG Live. The same people who also produce Coachella Valley Music and Arts Festival, Rock on the Range and other festivals around the world.

The first Panorama took place in the summer of 2016 and was met with some controversy. Founder's Entertainment, the creators behind Governors Ball Music Festival, petitioned the city of New York and Mayor Bill de Blasio to have the dates of Panorama changed. Founder's Entertainment's major concern was that Panorama's ticket sales would cut into their own festival's. De Blasio obliged and the festival was moved to 7 weeks after Governors Ball, rather than the original 2 weeks, to avoid compromised ticket sales.

Panorama 2016 
The inaugural Panorama was held July 22 through July 24. The weekend long festival hosted artists from various genres.

Lineup

Friday July 22nd 

 Arcade Fire
 Alabama Shakes
 Major Lazer
 FKA Twigs
 Silversun Pickups
 Schoolboy Q
 Broken Social Scene
 DJ Khaled
 Mike D
 Lindsey Stirling
 Netsky (musician)
 Preservation Hall Jazz Band
 DJ Harvey
 Madlib
 Here We Go Magic
 White Lung
 Little Scream

Saturday July 23rd 

 Kendrick Lamar
 The National (band)
 Sufjan Stevens
 Flosstradamus
 Blood Orange
 Foals (band)
 Daughter (band)
 Anderson Paak
 AlunaGeorge
 Jai Wolf
 Kaytranada
 Tokimonsta
 The Julie Ruin
 Oh Wonder
 Melanie Martinez (singer)
 Ex Hex (band)
 Aurora (singer)
 Horse meat disco
 Museum of Love
 Caveman (group)
 JDH & Dave P

Sunday July 24th 

 LCD Soundsystem
 Sia
 ASAP Rocky
 Kurt Vile & The Violators
 Run the Jewels
 Grace Potter
 Rufus Du Sol
 Flatbush Zombies
 The Front Bottoms
 SZA (singer)
 Nathaniel Rateliff & the Night Sweats
 Holy Ghost!
 Tensnake
 Classixx
 Show Me The Body
 Prinze George
 The Black Madonna
 Lloydski

Panorama 2017 
The festival's second year will take place July 28 through July 30.

Lineup

Friday July 28th 

 Frank Ocean
 Solange Knowles
 MGMT
 Future Islands
 Tyler, The Creator
 Spoon
 Girl Talk
 DJ Shadow
 Vance Joy
 Isaiah Rashad
 MØ
 Breakbot
 Foxygen
 Marcellus Pittman
 Cherry Glazerr
 Honne
 24 Hours
 Jamila Woods

Saturday July 29th 

 Tame Impala
 Alt-J
 Nick Murphy
 Nicolas Jaar
 Belle and Sebastian
 Vince Staples
 Jagwar Ma
 Matoma
 Mitski
 Hot Since 82
 Sofi Tukker
 S U R V I V E
 THEY.
 Pinegrove
 Noname
 Bleached
 Huerco S.
 Anthony Naples
 Mister Saturday Night
 Jayda G

Sunday July 30th 

 Nine Inch Nails
 A Tribe Called Quest
 Justice
 Glass Animals
 Cashmere Cat
 Angel Olsen
 Andrew McMahon
 Snakehips
 Kiiara
 Mura Masa
 Cloud Nothings
 Preoccupations
 Dhani Harrison
 Bishop Briggs
 6LACK
 Towkio
 Tim Sweeney
 DJ Heather

Panorama 2018

Line-up

Friday July 27th

The Weeknd
Migos
Father John Misty
The War on Drugs
Dua Lipa
Jhené Aiko
Daniel Caesar
Charlotte Gainsbourg
Sabrina Claudio
The Black Madonna
Soulection
Yaeji
Mall Grab
Supa Bwe
Mike Servito
Turtle Bugg
Bearcat

Saturday July 28th

Janet Jackson
SZA
Lil Wayne (replaced Cardi B on the lineup)
Gucci Mane
St. Vincent
PVRIS
Japanese Breakfast
Floating Points
Sigrid
Bicep
Jay Som
Kyle Hall
Avalon Emerson
Lo Moon
DJ Python
Kalin White
Riobamba

Sunday July 29th

The Killers
The xx
ODESZA
David Byrne
Fleet Foxes
Greta Van Fleet
Mount Kimbie
Chicano Batman
Nora En Pure
Robert DeLong
Moodymann
Rex Orange County
Shannon and the Clams
Downtown Boys
Helena Hauff
Jlin
Laurel Halo
Shanti Celeste
DJ Haram

The Lab 
The Lab, sponsored by Hewlett-Packard, is the festival's art component.

Exclusively featuring NYC artists, The Lab seeks to focus on experiential arts with an interactive space exhibition and a 360 virtual reality theater.

2016 Artists 

 Antfood
 Dave and Gabe
 Dirt Empire
 Emilie Baltz (& Philip Seirzega)
 Future Wife
 Gabriel Pulecio
 Invisible Light Network
 Red Paper Heart
 The Mountain Gods (Philip Sierzega & Charlie Whitney)
 VolvoxLabs
 Zach Lieberman

References 

Music festivals in New York City